Sweet Silence Studios was the leading Danish recording studio for rock music during most of its existence. It was originally built in Amager by Danish engineers Freddy Hansson, Flemming Rasmussen and Stig Kreutzfeldt beginning in February 1976. Flemming Rasmussen was immediately hired as assistant engineer, who later became producer and main engineer, taking full ownership of the studio in 1999. The studios relocated a short distance, start 2000, sometimes being credited as "Sweet Silence Upstair Studios" afterward, and closed in 2008. The building was demolished in 2009 to make way for an apartment complex and a car park. Rasmussen then moved to Winding Road Studios in Copenhagen, where he stayed until opening Sweet Silence North in Helsingør in January 2015.
The studio in Helsingør was closed December 2017, and moved to Copenhagen, January 2018 in Bådehavnsgade, Sydhavnen.

References

Recording studios in Denmark
Buildings and structures completed in 1976
Buildings and structures demolished in 2009
1976 establishments in Denmark
Culture in Copenhagen